Ruby Archer  (Ruby Archer Doud or Ruby Archer Gray)  (born Kansas City, Missouri, January 28, 1873, died Los Angeles, California,  January 23, 1961) was an American poet.

She was educated at Kansas City High School and by private tutors. She was married to Dr. Frank Newland Doud on March 27, 1910 and later to Benjamin Franklin Gray. She contributed poems, translations from French and German dramas and lyrics, and prose articles on art, architecture, music, Biblical literature, philosophy, etc. to papers and magazines.

Collection
Little Poems by Ruby Archer, a reprint of the 1900 edition by Kessinger Publishing (2009),

References
The California Birthday Book

1873 births
1961 deaths
American translators
Writers from California
Poets from Missouri
Writers from Kansas City, Missouri